C. tenuis may refer to:
 Cattleya tenuis, the slender-stemmed cattleya, an orchid species
 Clypeola tenuis, a gastropod species
 Cystopteris tenuis, the Mackay's bladder fern or Mackay's fragile fern, a fern species found in the northeastern United States

See also
 Tenuis (disambiguation)